The Canadian Coalition for Firearm Rights (CCFR) is a Canadian gun rights organization.

History 
The organization was founded by lawyer Tracey Wilson in the autumn of 2015 shortly after the Liberal Party of Canada won the 2015 Canadian federal election, splintering from the National Firearms Association. Rod Giltaca was the CCFR's first president and currently is the CEO and executive director. Giltaca said he shot his first firearm in San Diego, California, and later "shifted [his] entire career to the firearms industry".

In 2018, a Liberal fundraising email described the group as "Canada's NRA", referring to the U.S. National Rifle Association. The CCFR responded by stating the Liberal Party was "using scare tactics like implying American lobby groups or politics are influencing Canadians or American style-gun laws are imminent". The Liberal Party later stated that the reference to the NRA was about the Canadian gun lobby as a whole, rather than the CCFR specifically.

In 2019, the organization encouraged members to make official complaints about medical doctor Najma Ahmed who was advocating for legal prohibition of assault rifles and pistols in Canada. The College of Physicians and Surgeons of Ontario rejected the complaints against Ahmed as "an abuse of process."

The group is opposed to the federal government's Bill C-21 amendments for gun control. In November 2022 Giltaca said, "[the government's] plan is to ban all firearms from civilian ownership in Canada," adding that ideology was driving the ban.

In December 2022, the group promoted an online shopping discount code, "POLY", seemingly in reference to the 1989 École Polytechnique massacre when a gunman killed 14 women. Massacre survivor and gun-control advocate Nathalie Provost criticized the group on December 2nd, describing the code as "incredibly disrespectful". The group claimed on their website that the code was unrelated to the massacre.  

On December 3rd, Montreal Canadians goaltender Carey Price posted on Instagram, expressing his support for the group and opposition to the Bill C-21 amendments. Two days later Price tweeted that he disagreed with the group's use of the promotional code. Price then said he still stood by his opinion on the amendments, but acknowledged and apologized on Instagram to those impacted by the massacre.

On December 18, 2022, the Montreal Gazette issued a retraction of, and apology for, statements it previously published in a column that indicated the group's promo code was meant to reference and make fun of the mass shooting at École Polytechnique. It noted that the promo code was instead a reference to the Twitter account @PolySeSouvient.

Organization 
The organization rejects the politicization of gun control legislation and calls for evidence-led solutions. 

The group was described in the book Firearms Law and the Second Amendment as an "activist group". In 2021, The Walrus described the CCFR as "Canada’s most prominent pro-gun group".

References

External links 

 Official website

Gun rights advocacy groups
Firearms-related organizations
2015 establishments in Canada